The Grand Prix scientifique de la Fondation Louis D. (Scientific Grand Prize of the Louis D. Foundation) is an award conferred annually by the Louis D. Foundation of the Institut de France. It is awarded for fundamental or applied research in the areas of the science, technology, engineering, and mathematics. Each year the prize has a different theme. The award has a €450,000 prize.

Laureates 
Winners of the prize are:

References

External links 
 http://www.grands-prix-institut-de-france.fr/fondation-louis-d

French science and technology awards
Institut de France